Toronto Water is the municipal division of the City of Toronto under Infrastructure and Development Services responsible for the water supply network, and stormwater and wastewater management in Toronto, Ontario, Canada, as well as parts of Peel and York Regions.

History

Early days
Water treatment was originally established in order to provide safe drinking water. In the 19th century, the water off the city's shores was severely polluted by the dumping of waste from residences and businesses.

Before 1842, Toronto's water supply was manually pumped from Lake Ontario, streams and wells. Water carters would take the water and distribute it to customers across the city.

Private water supply
From 1843 to 1873, water was privately provided by Furniss Works or Toronto Water Works, a subsidiary of Toronto Gas Light and Water Company, which was owned by Montreal businessman Albert Furniss.

Following Furniss's death in 1872, the City of Toronto bought out Furniss Works and transformed the water supply to public hands under the Toronto Water Works Commission.

Suburban water supply 
Outside of the pre-amalgamation City of Toronto each of the former municipalities had its own treatment plants and pumping stations. North York had three, one at Oriole, which was built in the 1923, the ruins of pumping station found near Duncan Mills Rd and Don Mills Rd, Steeles built in the 1930s, and Sheppard West built in the 1940s. Scarborough had one built in 1921 and New Toronto had one built in 1924. Prior to the 1950s, the municipalities were responsible for water treatment and water came from local water sources like wells and streams.

Metro Toronto
The current system was introduced in the mid-1950s, with the formation of Metro Toronto in 1954, and was managed by Metro Toronto. Since 1975, Toronto has supplied water to York Region (mostly to residents in the south end of York).

City of Toronto 
Following amalgamation in 1998, Toronto Water was created from the Toronto Works and Emergency Services and once part of Metro Toronto Works department.

As of April 2005, the departments and commissioners were replaced by divisions under the City Manager (and Deputy Managers). Toronto Water is now under the Toronto Water Division.

Drinking water operations

Treatment process
Water pumped from Lake Ontario is treated via conventional drinking water treatment processes:

Pre-Chlorination
Flocculation and sedimentation
Filtration
Chlorination
Chloramination, prior to distribution

Treatment plants 
The City of Toronto uses four water treatment plants, all of which are located next to and get their water from Lake Ontario:

R.C. Harris Water Treatment Plant 

The R. C. Harris Water Treatment Plant is located east of Old Toronto at the eastern end of Queen St East and the foot of Victoria Park Ave at Lake Ontario. It is the oldest of the operational water treatment plants in Toronto, being opened on November 1, 1941 after construction started in 1932.

Prior to the construction of the water treatment plant, the area was the site of Victoria Park, a waterfront amusement park that operated from 1878 until 1906, and then the site was used by the Victoria Park Forest School until construction started in 1932. The plant is named after Roland Caldwell Harris, who was the Public Works Commissioner from 1912 to 1945. He was involved in projects including the Prince Edward Viaduct, the Mount Pleasant bridge, and the expansion of the Toronto Civic Railways' streetcar network. Known for its Art Deco style, the building is dubbed “The Palace of Purification” and was designated under the Ontario Heritage Act in 1998.

Island Water Treatment Plant 
The Island Water Treatment Plant is located on the Toronto Islands. The plant produces approximately 20% of Toronto's drinking water. The plant sits on the site of the first water treatment plant in Toronto, which was built in the 1900s and is no longer in service. The cold, treated water produced by the plant passes through a heat exchange system, which enables Enwave's Deep Lake Water Cooling project to cool buildings across the harbour in Downtown Toronto.

F. J. Horgan Water Treatment Plant 

The F. J. Horgan Water Treatment Plant is located in Scarborough in the West Hill neighbourhood on Lake Ontario. It is the newest of Toronto's water treatment plants, being opened in 1979. The plant produces approximately 20% of Toronto's drinking water. The plant is named after Frank J. Horgan, the Commissioner of Works for Metro Toronto from 1980 to 1989.

In 2009, the plant was expanded by Alberici in a  contract. The expansion included the construction of a new building with three ozone tanks, five filter boxes, and two backwash surge tanks. As of 2022, it remains the only plant in Toronto that uses ozone as the primary disinfectant to control pathogens, seasonal taste, and odour. The plant features a green roof and a 10-megawatt standby power plant to meet demand in the event of a power outage.

R. L. Clark Water Treatment Plant 
The R. L. Clark Water Treatment Plant is located in Etobicoke in New Toronto on Lake Ontario. The plant was on November 22, 1968. The plant was originally called the Westerly Plant, but it was later named after Ross Leopold Clark, the Commissioner of Works for Metropolitan Toronto from 1956 to 1979. The plant replaced the New Toronto Filtration Plant, which was opened in 1915.

Distribution

The drinking water distribution system operated by Toronto Water comprises 6 pressure zones and approximately 520 km of watermains (greater than 150 mm in diameter).

Pumping stations are located across the city to pump water from the filtration plants to residences. They are particularly critical since the city gains in elevation as it moves northwards away from Lake Ontario. Some pumping stations are located outside the city.

The City of Toronto operates 18 water pumping stations as of 2014:

Storage
Toronto water stores water in three formats:
 Floating reservoir: Newer Water tower or older Water tank with limited capacity.
 Ground level reservoir: Underground water storage with grass covered top with large capacity.
 Temporary storage: Stored at a water treatment plant with limited capacity.

Water in the city is stored once it is treated, ensuring uninterrupted water supply.

There are 4 water towers located in the city. They are mainly located in areas that cannot accommodate underground reservoirs due to space restrictions.

There are 10 underground reservoirs across Toronto and in Markham:

There are in-plant temporary storage tanks storing water as well:

Wastewater treatment

Treatment process 
Toronto's wastewater treatment plants treat wastewater in a 5 step process:

 Screening
 Git removal
 Primary treatment
 Secondary treatment
 Disinfection

During screening, large objects such as rocks and sticks that get washed into the sewer system are removed. Git removal removes smaller objects like tampons, dental floss, and wipes. Primary treatment separates human waste from wastewater. Secondary treatment uses microscopic organism to reduce and convert pollutants in the wastewater. This stage also removes nitrogen and phosphorus from the wastewater. Disinfection destroys any remaining harmful pathogens. After disinfection, the effluent wastewater meets all Ministry standards and is returned to the natural environment and reused within the facility for internal process use.

Solids removed during primary treatment and secondary treatment are pumped into digesters which allow a biological process that uses microorganisms, heat, mixing, and a 10-20 day holding time to break down complex organic matter into simpler forms. This produces methane as a byproduct. This produces biosolids, which are rich in organic material and nutrients.

Treatment plants 
The City of Toronto has four facilities that process wastewater before it is returned to the lake:

Ashbridges Bay Wastewater Treatment Plant 

The Ashbridges Bay Wastewater Treatment Plant is located on the east end of the Port Lands, south of the intersection of Leslie St and Lake Shore Blvd East along Lake Ontario. The plant began operation in 1917 and was originally called the Main Treatment Plant.

North Toronto Wastewater Treatment Plant 
The North Toronto Wastewater Treatment Plant is located in the Don Valley north of the Millwood Rd over the Don Valley Parkway. The treatment plant discharges into the Don River. The plant has a capacity of  serving a population of 55,000. The plant began operations in 1929. The plant is one of several legacy projects of Roland Caldwell Harris, the Public Works Commissioner from 1912 to 1945. The plant was partly created after North Toronto residents threatened to de-amalgamate over inadequate sewage treatment in the late 1920s.

Highland Creek Wastewater Treatment Plant 
The Highland Creek Wastewater Treatment Plant is located at the mouth of Highland Creek in the West Hill neighborhood of Scarborough. The plant began operations in 1956. The operations of the plant, especially the handling of the 41,000 wet tonnes of biosolids the plant produces each year is an issue of concern to residents around the plant. A neighbourhood liaison committee has been established to allow residents to discuss these concerns.

Humber Wastewater Treatment Plant 

The Humber Wastewater Treatment Plant is located near the mouth of the Humber River on The Queensway. The plant first began operations in 1960. Local residents have been complaining about the smell produced by the plant during hotter weather. The city spent  in 2018 to help reduce the smell produced by the plant.

Heavy rainfall 
During heavy rainstorms, some excess flow which cannot be handled by the treatment plant many be diverted around some of the plant's treatment processes. As this bypass happens during storm events, the waster is mostly rain water, often with a ratio of four or five parts rain to one part sewage. These bypasses can happen at the Ashbridges Bay Wastewater Treatment Plant and the Humber Wastewater Treatment Plant, as these plants serve areas of the city with older combined sewers, which carry both sewage and stormwater to water treatment plants.

In addition to bypasses at wastewater treatment plants, the city also has detention storage facilities that can temporarily hold sewage for treatment at a later time when the treatment plants are no longer operating at full capacity. These detention facilities include the Kenilworth Ave Tank which was put into operation in 1990 and the Maclean Ave Tank which was put into operation in 1995.

References

External links
 
 

Municipal government of Toronto
Water supply and sanitation in Canada
City of Toronto departments